Chebrolu may refer to any of the following places in the Indian state of Andhra Pradesh:
 
 Chebrolu, East Godavari district, a village in Gollaprolu mandal
 Chebrolu, West Godavari district, a village in Unguturu mandal
 Chebrolu mandal, a mandal in Guntur district
 Chebrolu, Guntur district, a temple town and mandal headquarters for Chebrolu mandal